The Twins is a Hong Kong television series adapted from Gu Long's novel Juedai Shuangjiao. The series was first aired on TVB in Hong Kong on 6 May 1979.

Cast
 Note: Some of the characters' names are in Cantonese romanisation.

 Wong Yuen-sun as Siu-yu-yee
 Shek Sau as Fa Mo-kuet
 Michelle Yim as So Ying
 Wong Hang-sau as Tit Sum-lan
 Ko Miu-see as Cheung Ching
 Paul Chu Kong as Kong Fung
 Lui Yau-wai as Fa Yuet-no
 So Hang-suen as Yiu-yuet
 Wan Lau-mei as Lin-sing
 Stanley Fung as Kong Pit-hok
 Wong Wan-choi as Kong Yuk-long
 Cheung Chung as Yin Nam-tin
 Idy Chan as Muk-yung Kau
 Cheng Lai-fong as Tit Ping-ku
 Cheung Mou-hau as Yam Kau-yau
 Ye Fung as Ha-ha-yee
 Chan Yee-hing as Tou Kiu-kiu
 Wong Sun as Lee Tai-chui
 Lau Nga-lai as Siu Mai-mai

External links
 

Hong Kong wuxia television series
Works based on Juedai Shuangjiao
TVB dramas
1979 Hong Kong television series debuts
Cantonese-language television shows
Television shows based on works by Gu Long
1970s Hong Kong television series